Telangana Boggu Ghani Karimka Sangham, a trade union of coal mine workers in the Singareni in the Indian state of Telangana. TBGKS is politically close to the party Telangana Rashtra Samithi.

References

Trade unions in India
Trade unions of the Singareni coal fields
Trade unions in Telangana
Telangana Rashtra Samithi
Mining trade unions
Year of establishment missing